Matthea Harvey (born September 3, 1973) is a contemporary American poet, writer and professor. She has published four collections of poetry. The most recent of these, If the Tabloids Are True What Are You?, a collection of poetry and images, was published in 2014. Prior to this, the collection Modern Life (2007) earned her the 2009 Kingsley Tufts Poetry Award and was a finalist for the 2007 National Book Critics Circle Award, and a New York Times Notable Book.

Life
Harvey was born in Germany, and grew up in England and Milwaukee, Wisconsin. She earned her B.A. from Harvard University and her M.F.A. from the Iowa Writers' Workshop. She currently lives in Brooklyn and teaches at Sarah Lawrence College. She is the sister of artist Ellen Harvey and is married to editor Rob Casper.

Harvey has served as the poetry editor of American Letters & Commentary as well as a contributing editor to jubilat and BOMB.

She has published poems in literary magazines including The New Yorker, The New Republic, Slope, Ploughshares, and The American Poetry Review.

Jeannine Hall Gailey described Harvey's Modern Life, as "obsessed with devastated worlds and hybrid forms of life,"  and the two longest poems in the collection, the "Terror of the Future" and "The Future of Terror," as abecedarian sequences that examine "the dysfunction between civilian and military populations in a stark, futuristic environment." Although Harvey has said that she "didn't set out to write political poems," but to explore "that idea of living in the middle of contradiction—in the grey area, between yes and no," the two poems were nonetheless acclaimed by The New York Times as "among the most arresting poems yet written about the current American political atmosphere . . . all the more surprising coming from a writer whose sensibility seems so resistant to our usual ideas about 'political poetry.' "

Published works
Poetry / Poetry collections
 Pity the Bathtub Its Forced Embrace of the Human Form, Alice James Books, 2000, 
 Sad Little Breathing Machine, Graywolf Press, 2004, 
 Modern Life, Graywolf Press, 2007, 
 If the Tabloids Are True What Are You (Graywolf Press, 2014)
 Matthea Harvey, Amy Jean Porter, When Up and Down Left Town (New York: Cabinet Books, 2016). 

Children's books
 
 Of Lamb: Poems, McSweeneys Books, 2011, 
 

In translation
Der kleine General und die riesenhafte Schneeflocke (luxbooks, 2008)
Du kennst das auch (kookbooks, 2010)

Anthologies
 The Best American Poetry 2005

References

External links
Author website
Tarpaulin Sky - Matthea Harvey - Poems from Modern Life
Tarpaulin Sky - Q&A: Matthea Harvey - by Selah Saterstrom, August 2006
Poetry Foundation Interview - Post-apocalypse, Poetry, and Robots: A Conversation With Matthea Harvey About Modern Life by Jeannine Hall Gailey
BookSlut: An Interview with Matthea Harvey October 2007
 Review of Modern Life.
 Alice James Books - Matthea Harvey - Author Page
Audio: Matthea Harvey at the Key West Literary Seminar, 2010
Interview with Harvey, September 2007, by Miriam Sagan

21st-century American poets
Living people
Iowa Writers' Workshop alumni
Poets from New York (state)
Writers from New York City
Poets from Wisconsin
Writers from Milwaukee
Sarah Lawrence College faculty
Harvard University alumni
1973 births
American women poets
21st-century American women writers
American women academics